Valentyna Rakytianska (15 October 1948 – 23 October 2021) was a Ukrainian librarian who was the director of the huge Kharkiv Korolenko State Scientific Library.

Early life 
Rakytianska was born in Tighina, Moldavian SSR (now Bender, under unrecognized Transnistrian control) in 1948. She graduated from the Kharkiv State Institute of Culture.

Career 
Rakytianska worked many years in library service, becoming the deputy director of the Kharkiv Korolenko State Scientific Library in 1984. In 1995, she became the director of the Kharkiv Korolenko State Scientific Library. 

Using funding from the United States Embassy, she modernized the library. Between 2004 and 2005, she expanded the local library network, making 27 book collections available.

Awards and honors 
 1998 – Diploma of the Kharkiv Regional State Administration
 1999 – Honored Worker of Culture of Ukraine 
 2003 – Diploma of the Kharkiv Regional State Administration

Personal life 
Rakytianska died in Kharkiv, Ukraine, on 23 October 2021 during the COVID-19 pandemic.

References 

1948 births
2021 deaths
People from Bender, Moldova
Women librarians
Ukrainian librarians
20th-century Moldovan women